Within the city-operated parks system of New York City, there are many parks that are either named after individuals of Italian and Italian American descent, or contain monuments relating to Italy.

Manhattan

DeLury Square
Tony Dapolito Rec Center
Vesuvio Playground
William F. Passannante Ballfield
Petrosino Square
Corporal John A. Seravalli Playground
Columbus Park
Father Demo Square
DeSalvio Playground
Fiorello La Guardia Park
Vincent F. Albano Jr. Playground
Verdi Square
Dante Park
Columbus Monument (Central Park)
Giovanni da Verrazzano Monument (Battery Park)
Peter Caesar Alberti Marker (Battery Park)
Giuseppe Garibaldi Monument (Washington Square Park)
Giuseppe Mazzini Monument (Central Park)

Bronx

 Ciccarone Park
 Bishop Pernicone Plaza
 Caserta Playground
 Bufano Playground
 Colucci Playground
 Michael Crescenzo Triangle
 Mazzei Playground
 D'Onofrio Square
 Columbus Monument (D’Auria-Murphy Triangle)

Queens

 Mentone Playground
 Ralph Demarco Park
 Chappetto Square
 Columbus Square
 Strippoli Square
 Josephine Caminiti Playground
 Simeone Park
 "Uncle" Vito F. Maranzano Glendale Playground
 Frontera Park
 Phil "Scooter" Rizzuto Park
 Ampere Playground
 Joseph P Addabbo Memorial Park (Tudor Park)
 Al Stabile Playground
 Judge Angelo Graci Triangle
 Salvatore Totino Triangle
 Marconi Park

Brooklyn

 Ascenzi Square
 Pvt. Sonsire Triangle
 Columbus Park
 Macri Triangle
 Father Giorgio Triangle
 Lentol Garden
 Badame Sessa Triangle
 Mt. Carmel Triangle
 Golconda Playground
 Sperandeo Brothers Playground
 Sam Leggio Triangle
 Dimattina Playground
 Mother Cabrini Park
 Valentino Pier
 Lt. Joseph Petrosino Park
 Pvt. Sonsire Triangle
 Garibaldi Playground
 Brizzi Playground
 Scarangella Park
 Anthony Catanzaro Square
 Meucci Triangle
 Cutinella Triangle
 Chiarantano Playground
 Barone Triangle
 Mondello Square
 Valentino Pier
 Verrazzano Memorial Flagstaff (John J Carty Park)

Staten Island

 Buono Beach
 De Matti Park
 Liotti Ikefugi Playground
 Lt. Lia Playground
 Christopher J. Igneri Playground
 Naples Playground
 Capodanno Memorial (South Beach)

References

Squares in New York City
Monuments and memorials in New York City
Italian-American culture in New York City
New York City parks-related lists